Robert Eric Wright (born January 1, 1969 in Rochester, N.Y.) is a business, economic, financial, and monetary historian and the inaugural Rudy and Marilyn Nef Family Chair of Political Economy at Augustana University in Sioux Falls, South Dakota.  He is also a research economist at the National Bureau of Economic Research.

Education 
After graduating from Fairport High School in 1987, Wright took degrees in History from Buffalo State College, where he was a member of the All-College Honors Program, and the University at Buffalo (Ph.D., 1997).

Research 
Since 2001, he has authored, co-authored, edited, or co-edited twenty books on topics including banks and banking, book publishing, construction, corporations, corporate genealogy, and corporate governance, economic indicators, entrepreneurship, government bailouts, insurance, money and monetary policy, public debts, public policies, and securities markets.

Wright's writings include a book on the role the real estate mortgage crisis of the 1760s played in the American Revolution.

Wright is a board member of Historians Against Slavery, an NGO. He edits its books series with Cambridge University Press, "Slaveries Since Emancipation," and serves on HAS's public speakers bureau. He is also associated with the Museum of American Finance.

Wright taught at New York University's Stern School of Business from 2003 until 2009. Before that, Wright taught economics at the University of Virginia,  where he worked with Virginia economist Ron Michener in a dispute against Dr. Farley Grubb, an economist at the University of Delaware, over the nature of colonial and early U.S. money and monetary systems.

Selected bibliography

Books 
 
 
 
 
 
 
 Wright, Robert E.; Sylla, Richard E. (2015). Genealogy of American finance. New York: Columbia University Press. .
 Wright, Robert E. (2017). Poverty of slavery: How unfree labor pollutes the economy. Palgrave Macmillan .

Book chapters 
 Wright, Robert E. (2012). "Capitalism in Early America: Rise of the Corporation Nation." In Gary Kornblith and Michael Zakim, eds., Capitalism Takes Command: The Social Transformation of Nineteenth Century America. Chicago: University of Chicago Press. .

Journal articles 
 Wright, Robert E.; Kingston, Christopher. (2010) "The Deadliest of Games: The Institution of Dueling," Southern Economic Journal 76, 4:1094-1106.

News articles

Further reading

References

External links 
 Robert E. Wright, National Bureau of Economic Research
 

Augustana University people
Living people
1969 births
21st-century American historians
21st-century American male writers
People from Rochester, New York
University at Buffalo alumni
Historians from New York (state)
American male non-fiction writers